The Montana Logging and Ballet Company is an American comedy and political satire group, having performed around the U.S. from 1975 until their retirement in 2013.  The group's four members, Tim Holmes, Steve Garnaas-Holmes, Rusty Harper and Bob FitzGerald, got their start at Rocky Mountain College in Billings, Montana. Holmes and Garnaas-Holmes are brothers.

They recorded several albums and broadcast many short radio sketches. Their first album, Take the Barriers Down, 1987, features liner notes by Archbishop Desmond Tutu.  Funds from the sale of these albums helped Tutu's transformative work for peaceful political change in South Africa prior to the first free elections in 1994, the focus of the title song. Like their first album, the second album We Don't Get It (1992) was arranged and produced by jazz guitarist Mundell Lowe; it also featured guitarist Tommy Tedesco.

Their releases Solutions to Our Nations Problems, Take 1,  (1999) and Take 2 (2001) featured selections from their regular appearances on National Public Radio's Sunday Weekend Edition, where they were billed as "resident political satirists" during the Clinton years. On the show they provided a series of short political satire sketches on the political issues of the day.

After 37 years performing together the quartet called it quits with a final concert tour of their home state of Montana, preserved in a documentary film, Love is the Journey: The Montana Logging and Ballet Co., which aired on Montana PBS in 2012.

References

External links 
Love is the Journey: The Montana Logging and Ballet Company Final televised performance of the Montana Logging and Ballet Company after 37 years of touring.  Produced by Montana PBS

American comedy musical groups
Musical groups established in 1975
Rocky Mountain College alumni
1975 establishments in Montana
2013 disestablishments in Montana